Saurauia pentapetala is a species of plant in the Actinidiaceae family. It is found in Malaysia and Thailand.

References

pentapetala
Least concern plants
Taxonomy articles created by Polbot